William Edward Flewett (1861–1938) was the 8th Bishop of Cork, Cloyne and Ross.

Educated at Trinity College Dublin, he was ordained in 1885. His first post was a  curacy at Lislee. He then held incumbencies at Corkbeg, Midleton, and Mallow before becoming Precentor of Cork Cathedral. From 1926 to 1933 he was Archdeacon of Cork then its Diocesan Bishop, dying in post on 5 August 1938. He is buried in the churchyard at Holy Trinity, Frankfield.

His grandson was Bishop of Limerick and Killaloe from 1985 to 2000.

Notes

Archdeacons of Cork
20th-century Anglican bishops in Ireland
Bishops of Killaloe and Clonfert
Bishops of Cork, Cloyne and Ross
1862 births
1934 deaths
Alumni of Trinity College Dublin